José Martínez Marsà (born 4 March 2002) is a Spanish professional footballer who plays as a defender for Sporting de Gijón, on loan from Portuguese club Sporting CP.

Club career
Born in Esplugues de Llobregat, Barcelona, Catalonia, Marsà was a youth product of La Masia. He began his senior career with Barcelona B in 2020. On 1 July 2021, he transferred to the Portuguese club Sporting CP, initially heading to their reserves. 

Marsà made his professional debut with Sporting in a 4–0 Primeira Liga win over Santa Clara on 14 May 2022, coming on as a sub in the 79th minute. On 31 January 2023, he returned to Spain after being loaned to Segunda División side Sporting de Gijón for the remainder of the season.

International career
Marsà is a youth international for Spain, having represented their Spain U17s and U18s. He represented the Spain U17s at the 2019 FIFA U-17 World Cup.

References

External links
 
 
 
 Sporting profile

2002 births
Living people
People from Esplugues de Llobregat
Sportspeople from the Province of Barcelona
Spanish footballers
Spain youth international footballers
FC Barcelona Atlètic players
Sporting CP B players
Sporting CP footballers
Sporting de Gijón players
Primeira Liga players
Primera Federación players
Segunda Divisão players
Spanish expatriate footballers
Spanish expatriate sportspeople in Portugal
Expatriate footballers in Portugal
Association football defenders